Constant Vanden Stock (13 June 1914 – 19 April 2008) was the president and a player of the Belgian football club R.S.C. Anderlecht. The stadium of this club was named after him. Constant Vanden Stock also served as coach of the Belgium national football team from 1958 to 1968.   He is the father of another club president, Roger Vanden Stock. 
He is also behind the bribery of referee Emilio Guruceta Muro to throw the UEFA cup semi-final against Nottingham Forest in 1984. 
Vanden Stock managed the family brewery Belle-Vue, famous for its Kriek and Lambic, until he sold it to beer giant Interbrew, now InBev.

References

1914 births
2008 deaths
Belgian footballers
R.S.C. Anderlecht players
Belgian football managers
Belgium national football team managers
Association football defenders